Habarakadage R. Perera (14 May 1932 – 1976) was a Sri Lankan sports shooter. He competed in the 50 metre rifle, prone event at the 1964 Summer Olympics.

References

External links
 

1932 births
1976 deaths
Sri Lankan male sport shooters
Olympic shooters of Sri Lanka
Shooters at the 1964 Summer Olympics
Place of birth missing